The Río Coyolate is a river in southwest Guatemala. Its sources are located in the Sierra Madre range, in the department of Chimaltenango. It flows southwards through the coastal lowlands of Suchitepéquez and Escuintla to the Pacific Ocean.

References

Rivers of Guatemala